Planet Bowl is a large tenpin bowling centre in Toronto, Ontario, Canada. It was the venue for 10 pin bowling for the 2015 Pan American Games after a change in site from Classic Bowl in Mississauga.

The centre, located in the Etobicoke district, is one of the largest in Toronto area with 48 lanes.

During the 2015 Games the venue was known as the Pan Am Bowling Centre.

See also
Venues of the 2015 Pan American and Parapan American Games

References

External links
Planet Bowl

Venues of the 2015 Pan American Games
Bowling alleys
Buildings and structures in Toronto
Etobicoke
Sports venues in Toronto